Gorakhpur - Anand Vihar Terminal Humsafar Express  is a  train of the Indian Railways connecting Gorakhpur in Uttar Pradesh to Anand Vihar Terminal in New Delhi . It is currently being operated with 12595/12596 train numbers on tri-weekly basis. It is the first  Hamsafar Train.

Coach Composition 

The train has 3-tier AC sleeper cabins designed by Indian Railways with features of LED screen display to show information about stations, train speed etc. and will have an announcement system as well, Vending machines for tea, coffee and milk, Bio toilets in compartments as well as CCTV cameras.

Service 
It averages 62 km/hr as 12595 Humsafar Express starts on Tuesday and covering 770 km in 12 hrs 50 mins & 65 km/hr as 12596 Humsafar Express starts on Friday covering 770 km in 11 hrs 50 mins.

Loco link 

Stoppage

See also 
 Humsafar Express
 Gorakhpur railway station
 Anand Vihar Terminal railway station
 Gorakhpur - Anand Vihar Terminal Humsafar Express (Via Barhni)

Notes

References 

12595/Gorakhpur - Anand Vihar Terminal Humsafar Express (Via Basti)
12596/Anand Vihar Terminal - Gorakhpur Humsafar Express (Via Basti)

Passenger trains originating from Gorakhpur
Transport in Delhi
Humsafar Express trains
Rail transport in Delhi
Railway services introduced in 2016